David Rikza Ariyanto (born 8 January 1987) is an Indonesian professional footballer who plays as a goalkeeper for Liga 2 club Persikab Bandung.

Club career

PSM Makassar
Ariyanto joined the Borneo team for 2016 Indonesia Soccer Championship A. He made his debut against Arema F.C. in the sixth week of the 2016 season.

Borneo
On 2017, He was signed a one-year contract with Liga 1 club Borneo. Ariyanto made his debut on 4 November 2017 in a match against Perseru Serui.

Kalteng Putra
On 2019, Ariyanto signed a contract with Liga 1 club Kalteng Putra on a free transfer. He made his debut on 26 July 2019 in a match against TIRA-Persikabo.

Persebaya Surabaya
In 2021, Ariyanto signed a contract with Indonesian Liga 1 club Persebaya Surabaya.

References

External links
 
 David Ariyanto at Liga Indonesia

Living people
1987 births
Indonesian footballers
Sportspeople from Cilacap Regency
Sriwijaya F.C. players
Persiwa Wamena players
PSM Makassar players
Borneo F.C. players
Liga 1 (Indonesia) players
Association football goalkeepers